The Vietnamese football league system contains two professional leagues, a semi-professional league and an amateur league for Vietnamese football clubs.

System by period

Current system

Cup eligibility

Domestic cups 
All V.League 1 and V.League 2 sides qualify for the Vietnamese Cup tournament.

Super Cup
The Super Cup is the first game of the season, played between the previous years' winners of the V.League 1 and Vietnamese Cup.  If the same team wins both tournaments, then the team finishing second in the previous years' V.League 1 take on the V.League 1 winners.

Continental competition 
For the 2021 season, one Vietnamese side, the team finishing top of V.League 1, qualifies automatically for the AFC Champions League Group Stage. The team finishing second in the V.League 1, and the winner of the Vietnamese Cup qualify for the AFC Cup Group Stage.

See also
 V.League 1
 V.League 2
 Vietnamese National Football Second League
 Vietnamese Cup
 Vietnamese Super Cup
 List of football clubs in Vietnam

External links 
  Official V.League website

 
Football league systems in Asia